The 1979–80 Edmonton Oilers season was the Oilers' eighth season, their first season in the National Hockey League (NHL), as they were one of the teams that were part of the WHA-NHL merger that took place on June 22, 1979.

The Oilers were led offensively by rookie superstar Wayne Gretzky, as he tied for the lead league in points at 137, however lost the Art Ross Trophy due to scoring 2 fewer goals than winner Marcel Dionne. Gretzky, however, won the Hart Memorial Trophy as MVP of the NHL but was declared ineligible for the Calder Memorial Trophy due to his playing days in the WHA.

Edmonton played six goaltenders during the season and was led by Eddie Mio's nine wins, while Ron Low, who came over in a trade with the Quebec Nordiques, would go 8–2–1 in 11 games with the Oilers.

They made the playoffs, however, they were quickly swept out by the powerful Philadelphia Flyers in 3 games, but Oilers fans were very excited about being part of the NHL, and of the future of the team.

Regular season

Final standings

Schedule and results

Playoffs

Player statistics

Scoring leaders

Goaltending

Playoff stats

Scoring leaders

Goaltending

Awards and records
 Wayne Gretzky - Hart Memorial Trophy

Records

Milestones

Transactions

Trades

*Oilers promised to not make Paul Shmyr one of its priority selections in the 1979 NHL expansion draft

Free agents

From waivers

Draft picks
Edmonton's draft picks at the 1979 NHL Entry Draft:

Expansion draft picks
Edmonton's expansion draft picks at the 1979 NHL Expansion Draft

Trades
The Montreal Canadiens traded Dave Hunter in exchange for Edmonton selecting Cam Connor.
The Toronto Maple Leafs traded Stan Weir in exchange for Edmonton not to select Ron Ellis.

Farm teams

See also
 1979–80 NHL season

References

SHRP Sports
The Internet Hockey Database
National Hockey League Guide & Record Book 2007

Edmonton Oilers season, 1979-80
Edmon
Edmonton Oilers seasons
Edmonton Oilers
Edmonton Oilers